This article catalogues the releases of the American band Electric Six.

Discography as Electric Six

Official canon studio albums

Kickstarter campaign and self-released studio albums

Soundtrack albums

Live albums

Compilations

Singles

Music videos

Films

Splits
Rockshow (7" split with Peaches)

Kickstarter Commissions
The band routinely offer the option for backers of their frequent Kickstarter campaigns to commission them to record an original song or cover version of a song by another artist. Although these are usually only made available to the backer, many have been made available online by their backer, leaked online or subsequently included on releases by the band.

Discography as The Wildbunch

Albums
 An Evening with the Many Moods of the Wildbunch's Greatest Hits... Tonight! (8-track) (Uchu Cult) (1996)
Don't Be Afraid of the Robot: Live at the Gold Dollar (CD) (Off Woodward Productions, GD-101) (1998-07-25)
 "Nuclear War (On the Dance Floor)"
 "Speak English"
 "Naked Pictures"
 "The Model"
 "Computer"
 "The Ballade of MC Sucka DJ"
 "Clones (We're All)"
 "Immolate Me"
 "Taxi to Nowhere"
 "Don't Be Afraid of the Robot"
 "Breaking Up" 
 "I'm on Acid"
 "R U Afraid of the Devil?"
 "Meat the Band"
 "I Am the Knife"
 "I Am Detroit"
 "I Lost Control"
 "Freshman"
 "I'm a Demon"
 "Tiny Little Men"
 "Take Off Your Clothes"
 "Gay Bar"
 "I Know Karate"
Rock Empire (CD) (Uchu Cult) (1999-07-??)
 "Don't Be Afraid of the Robot"
 "Remote Control (Me)"
 "Gay Bar"
 "TV"
 "Getting Into the Jam"
 "Take Me to Your Leader"
 "Animal Attraction"
 "Dancing Like an Idiot"
 "Synthesizer"
 "I Am the Knife"
 "Naked Pictures (Of Your Mother)"
 "R U Afraid of the Devil?"
 "I'm on Acid"
 "Computer"
 "Christian Radio Manchester"
 "I Am Detroit"
 "Honolulu"
 "I'm a Demon"
 "Gay Bar (Remix)"
 "Persona vs. Wildbunch"

Singles
"I Lost Control (Of My Rock'n' Roll)" (7") (Uchu Cult, SC 001) (1996)
500 copies
 "I Lost Control (Of My Rock and Roll)" 
 "Tiny Little Men"
 "Gay Bar" 
 "I Know Karate" 
"The Ballade of MC Sucka DJ" (7") (Flying Bomb Records, FLB-105) (1997)
 "Take Off Your Clothes" 
 "Nuclear War (On the Dancefloor)" 
 "The Ballade of MC Sucka DJ" 
"Danger! High Voltage" (7") (Flying Bomb Records, FLB-117) (2001)
recorded by Jim Diamond
 "Danger (High Voltage)" 
 "Neurocameraman" 
 "She's Guatemala"

Compilations
"X-Mas Surprise Package" (7") (Flying Bomb Records, FLB-106) (1997)
"X-Mas Xorcismus (Ho Ho Ho)"
Clear green or black vinyl
Troy Gregory's Sybil (CD) (Fall of Rome Records, FOR 1005) (2002)
"Dealin' in Death N' Stealin' in the Name of the Lord"
Recorded by Jim Diamond

References

External links
The Wildbunch releases and members info
Electric Six releases and members info

Discographies of American artists
Rock music group discographies